Péter Vörös (born 14 December 1977) is a Hungarian football player who currently plays for Lokomotiv Tashkent.

FIFA World Youth Championship 
In 1997, Péter Vörös was a participant in the FIFA World Youth Championship which was held in Malaysia, where Hungary failed to reach the second round.
In this tournament, Péter made his only appearance against Canada where Hungary was defeated by 2–1 in front of 4000 spectators.

Honours  
Hungarian Second Division:  Winner: 2008

External links 
 www.hlsz.hu 

1977 births
Living people
Footballers from Budapest
Hungarian footballers
Hungary youth international footballers
Association football midfielders
Veszprém LC footballers
Békéscsaba 1912 Előre footballers
Szeged LC footballers
MTK Budapest FC players
Lombard-Pápa TFC footballers
BKV Előre SC footballers
BFC Siófok players
Johor Darul Ta'zim F.C. players
Viktoria Aschaffenburg players
Gyirmót FC Győr players
Szombathelyi Haladás footballers
PFC Lokomotiv Tashkent players
Kecskeméti TE players
Szolnoki MÁV FC footballers
Pálhalma SE players
Hungarian expatriate footballers
Expatriate footballers in Malaysia
Expatriate footballers in Germany
Expatriate footballers in Uzbekistan
Hungarian expatriate sportspeople in Malaysia
Hungarian expatriate sportspeople in Germany
Hungarian expatriate sportspeople in Uzbekistan